Calamotropha nigripunctellus is a moth in the family Crambidae. It was described by John Henry Leech in 1889. It is found in Zhejiang, China.

References

Crambinae
Moths described in 1889